In mathematics, a measurable acting group is a special group that acts on some space in a way that is compatible with structures of measure theory. Measurable acting groups are found in the intersection of measure theory and group theory, two sub-disciplines of mathematics. Measurable acting groups are the basis for the study of invariant measures in abstract settings, most famously the Haar measure, and the study of stationary random measures.

Definition 

Example: Measurable groups as measurable acting groups 
One special case of measurable acting groups are measurable groups themselves.

References 

Group theory
Measure theory